Deborrea  humberti is a species of bagworm moth native to Madagascar.

Biology
The length of the bag 35–45 mm for the male and 45–60 mm for the female. The length of the female adult is 25–35 mm with a wingspan of 37–45 mm.

Known foodplants are: Leguminosae (probably Albizzia sp.) and Casuarinaceae (Casuarina equisetifolia).

This species occurs in forest biotopes, from Port Berge to Antsiranana, Betroka to Betioky. Its flight periods are June–August and October.

See also
 List of moths of Madagascar

References
 

Psychidae
Lepidoptera of Madagascar
Moths described in 1984
Moths of Madagascar
Moths of Africa